This is a list of relevant Valencian pilotaris, that is, players of Valencian pilota.

This list is ordered by varieties, but it should be taken into account that the only two professional modalities are Escala i corda and Raspall. So, for example, good Galotxa players used to change to Escala i corda, and retired players move to less demanding varieties as Valencian fronto.

For a complete list of professional Escala i corda players see ValNet, the company that contracts all of them.

Escala i corda

A 
 Adrián I of Sueca
 Adrián II of Museros
 Álvaro of Faura, member of the Squad
 Aucejo of Meliana

B 
 Barraca
 Boni

C 
 Canana II
 Canari of Rafelbunyol
 Cervera of Alaquàs
 Colau of La Pobla de Vallbona

D 
 Dani of Benavites, member of the Squad

E 
 Espínola of Albal
 Eusebio of Riola

F 
 Fèlix of Dénia
 Fredi of Valencia, member of the Squad

G 
 Genovés I of Genovés, member of the Squad
 Genovés II of Genovés, member of the Squad
 Grau of Valencia, member of the Squad

H 
 Héctor of La Vall de Laguar, member of the Squad
 Herrera of Beniparrell

J 
 Javi of Massalfafar
 Jesús of Silla
 Juliet of Alginet

L 
 León of Genovés

M 
 Melchor of Benavites
 Mezquita of Vila-real, member of the Squad
 Miguel of Petrer
 Miguelín of Valencia

N 
 El Nel of Murla
 Núñez of Quart de Poblet

O 
 Oltra of Genovés
 Oñate of Massamagrell

P 
 Pasqual II of La Pobla de Vallbona, member of the Squad
 Pedrito of Valencia
 Pedro of Valencia, member of the Squad
 Pere of Pedreguer
 Pigat II of Genovés, ex-member and coach of the Squad
 Pigat III of Genovés
 Primi of Gata de Gorgos
 Puchol of Vinalesa

Q 
 Alberto Arnal, el Xiquet of Quart

R 
 Raül II of Godelleta, member of the Squad
 Ribera II
 Rovellet of Valencia

S 
 Salva of Massamagrell
 Sarasol I of Genovés, member of the Squad
 Sarasol II of Genovés, member of the Squad
 Solaz of Valencia
 Soro III of Massamagrell

T 
 Tato of Altea, member of the Squad
 Tino of Valencia, member of the Squad

V 
 Vicentico of Moncofa
 Víctor of Valencia
 Voro of Montserrat

X 
 Terenci Miñana, el Xiquet of Simat

Frares

Galotxa

F 
 Ferdi of Godelleta, member of the Squad

Galotxetes

Llargues

D 
 Dani of La Nucia, member of the Squad
 David of Petrer, member of the Squad

J 
 Jan of Murla, member of the Squad

M 
 Màlia I of La Vall de Laguar, member of the Squad
 Martínez of El Campello, member of the Squad

S 
 Santi of Finestrat, member of the Squad

T 
 Tonico, member of the Squad

X 
 Emili Revert, el Xiquet of Llanera

Raspall

A 
 Agustí
 Alberto of Aielo de Malferit
 Armando of Bicorp

B 
 Batiste
 Batiste II

C 
 Carlos of Oliva
 Coeter I of Simat de la Valldigna
 Coeter II of Simat de la Valldigna

D 
 Dorín of Xeraco

E 
 Francisquet

G 
 Galán
 Gorxa

J 
 Juan of Genovés
 Juan Gracia

L 
 Leandro I
 Leandro II
 Leandro III
 Loripet of Aielo de Malferit

M 
 Malonda IV of Oliva
 Martí
 Morera
 Moro of Alcàntera de Xúquer

P 
 Pigat I of Genovés

S 
 Sanchis of Oliva
 Sariero

V 
 Vilare

W 
 Waldo of Oliva, member of the Squad

Valencian Fronto

See also 
 Valencian Pilota Squad
 ValNet
 Players of the ValNet firm
 List of Valencian trinquets

People from the Valencian Community
Valencian pilota